The Coming of Winter is a novel by Canadian writer David Adams Richards, published in 1974. His debut novel, it was published after an excerpt from the novel won the Norma Epstein Prize for unpublished writing by Canadian university students.

The novel centres on Kevin Dulse, a young man going through a difficult period as he approaches his 21st birthday.

The novel was subsequently reissued as part of the New Canadian Library series.

References

1974 Canadian novels
Novels by David Adams Richards
Novels set in New Brunswick
New Canadian Library